Rear Admiral Santosh Kumar Gupta, MVC, NM is a former flag officer of the Indian Navy. He was awarded the Maha Vir Chakra, the nation's second-highest gallantry award for his command of INAS 300 during the Indo-Pak War of 1971.

Maha Vir Chakra 
The citation for the Maha Vir Chakra reads as follows:

Post-retirement
Currently Admiral Gupta resides in Bangalore.

References

1936 births
Recipients of the Maha Vir Chakra
Indian Navy admirals
The Doon School alumni
Living people
Recipients of the Nau Sena Medal